A&B may refer to:

Above & Beyond (band)
Abrams & Bettes: Beyond the Forecast, a program on The Weather Channel
Alexander & Baldwin, an American company
Alston & Bird, an international law firm based in Atlanta, Georgia. 
Antigua and Barbuda, a small island nation in the Caribbean
Arbogast & Bastian (A&B Meats), a defunct meat-packing company based in Allentown, Pennsylvania, USA
Assault and battery (disambiguation)
Roman Catholic Diocese of Arundel and Brighton, England
A&B, a bit signaling procedure used in SF (D4) framed T1 transmission facilities